Calogero (Charly) Chiarelli (born October 2, 1948) is a Canadian writer, storyteller, actor and musician.

Born in Racalmuto, Sicily, Chiarelli grew up in the industrial north end of Hamilton, Ontario. He has a Master's degree in Social Work from Carleton University; also degrees in Psychology from McMaster University and Linguistics from the University of Toronto.

As a writer, storyteller and virtuoso harmonica player Charly Chiarelli is well known for his one-person plays, most notably Cu'Fu, Mangiacake, Brutta Figura and Sunamabeach directed for theatre by Ronald Weihs. A filmed performance of Cu'Fu, Mangiacake and Brutta Figura directed by Gemini Award winner, Dennis Beauchamp, were first aired on May 31, 2000 on Bravo! and has been re-aired periodically. He co-wrote and starred in the 2019 film Road to the Lemon Grove with Burt Young, Nick Mancuso, Rossella Brescia, Loreena McKennitt and Tomaso Sanelli. Chiarelli was inducted in 2003 into the McMaster University Alumni Gallery  that includes inductee notables like Martin Short, Dave Thomas and Eugene Levy. As a Jazz and Blues harmonica player Chiarelli has contributed to recordings and live performances as well as creating his own musical works.

References

External links 
 Road to the Lemon Grove
 Artword Theatre

1948 births
Living people
Italian emigrants to Canada
20th-century Canadian dramatists and playwrights
21st-century Canadian dramatists and playwrights
Canadian male stage actors
Male actors from Hamilton, Ontario
Carleton University alumni
McMaster University alumni
University of Toronto alumni
Canadian male dramatists and playwrights
20th-century Canadian male writers
21st-century Canadian male writers
Canadian male film actors
20th-century Canadian male actors
21st-century Canadian male actors